Don't Knock the Rock is a 1956 American musical film starring Alan Dale and Alan Freed. Directed by Fred F. Sears, the film also features performances by Bill Haley & His Comets, Little Richard, The Treniers, and Dave Appell and the Applejacks.

The title of the film comes from one of Haley's hit singles of 1956. The Haley recording is played over the opening credits, but it is Alan Dale who performs the number in the film. Indeed, while Haley and his band are the top-billed performers in the movie, the story in fact focuses on Dale's character.

Synopsis
Dale stars as Arnie Haines, a rock and roll star who returns to his hometown to rest up for the summer only to find that rock and roll has been banned there by disapproving adults. Among those against him is influential newspaper columnist Arline MacLaine, though this does not stop Arnie from starting up a romance with MacLaine's daughter Francine. At Francine's urging, Arnie decides to perform a show to demonstrate to Arline that the adults' fears are unjustified. Meanwhile, MacLaine's columns have led to other towns across the country canceling planned rock and roll shows. This leaves big-name acts like Bill Haley, Little Richard, The Treniers and Dave Appell available to perform in Arnie's show.

The show goes well at first, with Arline prepared to write a new column acknowledging that the music is harmless. However, things go awry when Arnie rejects the advances of local girl Sunny Everett.  In retaliation, Sunny gets drunk and gets two boys to begin a brawl.  No one believes that Sunny was at fault and the resulting newspaper articles reporting that the show led to a drunken brawl among its attendees give rock and roll a worse reputation than ever.

As his final play, Arnie works with a local theater group to put on a show called "The Pageant of Art and Culture" to appeal to the adults.  The show opens with depictions of paintings by Vermeer and Renoir, followed by a minuet dance performance, this show of high culture meeting with the strong approval of the adults in attendance.  However, the show's next number is taken directly from those adults' own days of youth: a raucous performance of the Charleston, providing a stark contrast between the entertainment in which the adults indulged when they were young and what they are now advocating for their children.

Arline gets the point and announces that she now agrees that parents have been using rock and roll as a scapegoat for their own parental failings.  Sunny's father agrees, noting that he now accepts that his daughter was at fault for the disruption at the rock and roll show. Arline offers Arnie an apology, both on the spot and in print, and the show closes with a rock and roll number, which even the adults now allow themselves to enjoy.

Cast
 Alan Dale as Arnie Haines
 Alan Freed as himself
 Fay Baker as Arline MacLaine
 Patricia Hardy as Francine MacLaine
 Bill Haley as himself
 Little Richard as himself
 The Treniers as Themselves

Reception
Don't Knock the Rock premiered in New York City on December 12, 1956 (The film is often listed in reference books as being a 1957 release, due to its December 1956 premiere). The film was an immediate follow-up to the earlier Rock Around the Clock, which had also starred Haley and Freed. Although Haley and the Comets were the top-billed stars of the film, their role in it was relatively minor and the film failed to duplicate the box office success of its predecessor. Today it is notable for the performances of Bill Haley and His Comets and Little Richard and the appearance of Alan Freed, all members of the Rock and Roll Hall of Fame.

Songs performed in the movie

 "Don't Knock the Rock" – Bill Haley and His Comets (audio only over opening credits)
 "I Cry More" – Alan Dale
 "You're Just Right" – Alan Dale
 "Hot Dog Buddy Buddy" – Bill Haley and His Comets
 "Goofin' Around" – Bill Haley and His Comets
 "Hook, Line And Sinker" – Bill Haley and His Comets (audio only)
 "Applejack" – Dave Appell and the Applejacks
 "Your Love Is My Love" – Alan Dale
 "Calling All Comets" – Bill Haley and His Comets
 "Out Of The Bushes" – The Treniers
 "Rip It Up" – Bill Haley and His Comets
 "Rocking On Saturday Night" – The Treniers
 "Gonna Run" – Alan Dale
 "Long Tall Sally" – Little Richard
 "Tutti-Frutti" – Little Richard
 "Country Dance" – Dave Appell and the Applejacks
 "Don't Knock the Rock" – Alan Dale

The version of the guitar instrumental "Goofin' Around" performed in this film differs from the version released on Decca Records; it has yet to be officially issued although a film audio recording of the scene in which it was played (as opposed to the original studio recording) was released in the late 1990s by the German label Hydra Records. Due to sheet music for the songs "Applejack" and "Country Dance" being released as a tie-in with this movie but with Bill Haley's, not Dave Appell's, photo on the cover, these songs, although Haley-sounding, are often erroneously cited as Bill Haley recordings.

Three Little Richard songs are featured: two performed by Richard himself, and the third is a cover version of his "Rip it Up" performed by Haley.

As with Rock Around the Clock, no official soundtrack album was released, though some non-American issues of Haley compilations tied in to the film. Haley's 1956 album, Rock 'n Roll Stage Show, includes four of the songs featured in the movie: "Hot Dog Buddy Buddy", "Goofin' Around", "Hook, Line and Sinker", and "Calling All Comets".

Home video release
Don't Knock the Rock was never released officially on VHS or laserdisc in North America. In 2006, the film was released on Region 1 DVD by Sony Pictures (current owners of the Columbia catalog) in a two-disc set with Rock Around the Clock.

See also
List of American films of 1956

References

External links
 
 
 

1956 films
1950s teen drama films
1950s musical drama films
American musical drama films
American teen drama films
American rock music films
American black-and-white films
Bill Haley
Columbia Pictures films
Films directed by Fred F. Sears
Films shot in Los Angeles
1956 drama films
1950s English-language films
1950s American films